"Detroit Rock City" is a song by the American hard rock group Kiss, released on their 1976 album Destroyer. The song was written by Paul Stanley and producer Bob Ezrin.

The song is one of the band's most popular and is a classic rock staple. It is also seen as one of the more technical songs musically in the band's canon. The song has been noted for being a duet between guitarists Stanley and Ace Frehley.

Composition and release
The song, recorded and released as a single in 1976, was the third single from Kiss's album Destroyer and was planned to be their last in support of the album. As a single, it did poorly in sales and radio play (other than in Detroit), and failed to chart in the U.S. even though it would prove to be a fan favorite. It came as a surprise that the B-side "Beth", a ballad written and sung by drummer Peter Criss, wound up catching on in different markets in the U.S., so the single was reissued with "Beth" as the A-side and "Detroit Rock City" as the B-side.

While the song briefly references Detroit, the real-life incident which inspired the lyric evidently did not take place there. "I had the basic riff of the song, the 'Get up, get down' part," Stanley recalls, "but I didn't know what the song was about except it was about Detroit. And then I remembered on the previous tour, I think it was in Charlotte, somebody had gotten hit by a car and killed outside the arena. I remember thinking how weird it is that people's lives end so quickly. People can be on their way to something that's really a party and a celebration of being alive and die in the process of doing it. So that became the basis for the lyric."

On Destroyer, the song segues into "King of the Night Time World", via the sounds of a car crash. The songs were played together on the Destroyer Tour.

On the original 7" version, the song was heavily edited; the intro was cut and the car crash ending the album version was inserted within the song itself, with the song fading out on the first bridge.

Bassist Gene Simmons wrote a notable bassline that was influenced by R&B music.

During the Rock & Roll Over Tour, Stanley changed the lyric, "I know I'm gonna die, why?" to "I know I'm gonna die, and I don't care!" The song was ranked at number six on VH1's 40 Greatest Metal Songs and is featured on the album Heavy MetalThe First 20 Years. "Detroit Rock City" was based on an earlier song that Kiss performed only in concert called "Acrobat". In 2014, Paste ranked the song number three on their list of the 20 greatest Kiss songs, and in 2019, Louder Sound ranked the song number one on their list of the 40 greatest Kiss songs.

Personnel
Kiss
Paul Stanleylead vocals, rhythm guitar
Gene Simmonsbass, backing vocals
Ace Frehleylead guitar
Peter Crissdrums

Additional personnel
Bob Ezrinspoken word and keyboards

References

Kiss (band) songs
1976 singles
Songs inspired by deaths
Songs written by Paul Stanley
Songs written by Bob Ezrin
Casablanca Records singles
Song recordings produced by Bob Ezrin
The Mighty Mighty Bosstones songs
Songs about Detroit
Songs about rock music